Quiet Lies is a 1982 album by American pop-country star Juice Newton. It reached #20 on the Billboard 200, her highest position on the chart, and included three major hits: "Love's Been a Little Bit Hard on Me", "Break It to Me Gently", and "Heart of the Night". Quiet Lies sold more than 900,000 copies in the United States in 1982 (earning Newton her fourth RIAA Gold certification) and was re-issued on CD in 1990 and 2006.

Hits
"Love's Been a Little Bit Hard on Me" was the first single released from the 1982 album, for which Newton received a "Best Female Vocalist - Pop" Grammy nomination. The video for this song received the "Video of the Year" award from the American Video Association. The song reached the Top 10 of the Billboard Hot 100 and Adult Contemporary charts.  It peaked at #30 on the Country chart.

The album's second single -- "Break It to Me Gently" (originally a 1962 hit for Brenda Lee) -- won Juice Newton her first Grammy in 1983, in the category of "Best Female Vocalist - Country". The song hit number one on the adult contemporary chart, number two on the country chart, and number 11 on the Hot 100. "Heart of the Night", written by John Bettis and Michael Clark, was the opening track for the album. It was released as the third and final single, reaching number four on the adult contemporary chart and 25 on the Billboard Hot 100 in February 1983.

Track list

Credits adapted from liner notes.

Personnel 
 Juice Newton – lead vocals, backing vocals (2, 8)
 Philip Aaberg – keyboards (1, 2, 4-7, 9, 10), synthesizers (4)
 Michael Boddicker – synthesizers (1, 2, 3)
 Richard Tee – keyboards (3)
 George Doering – electric guitar (1-8), guitar solo (1, 6, 8), acoustic guitar (9, 10)
 Fred Tackett – acoustic guitar
 Andrew Gold – guitar (2), guitar solo (2), backing vocals (2, 4, 6-10)
 Chuck Martin – electric guitar (3, 7), guitar solo (3, 7)
 Doug Livingston – pedal steel guitar (9, 10)
 Neil Stubenhaus – bass (1, 2, 4-10)
 Rick Shlosser – drums (1, 2, 3, 7)
 Vinnie Colaiuta – drums (4, 5, 6, 8, 9, 10)
 Steve Forman – percussion (1, 2, 6, 7, 9), Jew's harp (9)
 David Landis – percussion (4)
 Emil Richards – vibraphone (6), chimes (6)
 David Boruff – saxophone (7)
 Jim Horn – saxophone (7)
 Kim Hutchcroft – saxophone (7)
 Tom Scott – saxophone (7)
 Charlie Calello – arrangements
 Joe Chemay – backing vocals (1)
 Steve George – backing vocals (1)
 Jim Haas – backing vocals (1)
 George Hawkins – backing vocals (1), bass (3)
 Jon Joyce – backing vocals (1)
 Richard Page – backing vocals (1)
 Otha Young – backing vocals (1, 2, 4, 8), electric guitar (2, 4), acoustic guitar (8)
 Chris Montan – backing vocals (2, 4, 6-10)
 Harry Stinson – backing vocals (2, 4, 6-10)

Production 
 Richard Landis – producer, management 
 Otha Young – associate producer 
 Joe Chiccarelli – recording
 Peter Granet – recording 
 Ed Thacker – mixing 
 Mitch Gibson – recording assistant, mix assistant 
 Paul Ray – recording assistant 
 Mark Sackett – recording assistant
 Bob Ludwig – mastering 
 Kathy Anaya – production coordinator 
 Roy Kohara – art direction 
 Henry Marquez – art direction 
 Charles Bush – photography

References

External links

1982 albums
Juice Newton albums
Capitol Records albums
Albums arranged by Charles Calello
Albums produced by Richard Landis